Bacho Kiro Peak is the rocky, partly ice-free peak rising to 1419 m between Woodbury Glacier and Montgolfier Glacier on Danco Coast in Graham Land, Antarctica.

The feature is named after the Bulgarian enlightener and revolutionary Bacho Kiro (Kiro Zanev, 1835–1876).

Location

British mapping in 1980.

Maps
 Antarctic Digital Database (ADD). Scale 1:250000 topographic map of Antarctica. Scientific Committee on Antarctic Research (SCAR). Since 1993, regularly upgraded and updated.

Notes

References
 Bacho Kiro Peak. SCAR Composite Antarctic Gazetteer.
 Bulgarian Antarctic Gazetteer. Antarctic Place-names Commission. (details in Bulgarian, basic data in English)

External links
 Bacho Kiro Peak. Copernix satellite image

Mountains of Graham Land
Danco Coast
Bulgaria and the Antarctic